Mary Teresa Slaney (formerly Tabb, née Decker, born August 4, 1958) is a retired American middle-distance runner. During her career, she won gold medals in the 1500 meters and 3000 meters at the 1983 World Championships, and was the world record holder in the mile, 5000 meters and 10,000 meters. In total, she set 17 official and unofficial world records, including being the first woman in history to break 4:20 for the mile. She also set 36 US national records at distances ranging from 800 meters to 10,000 meters, and has held the US record in the mile, 2000 meters and 3000 meters since the early 1980s, while her 1500 meters record stood for 32 years. In 2003, she was inducted into the National Track and Field Hall of Fame.

Early life
Mary Decker was born in Bunnvale, New Jersey. A decade later her family moved to Garden Grove in Southern California, where Decker started running. A year later, aged 11, she won her first local competition.

She joined her school athletics club and a local track club, and completely immersed herself in running, for which she would pay an injury-laden price later in her career. At age 12, she completed a marathon and four middle- and long-distance races in one week, ending the week with an appendectomy operation.

Career
In her early teens, Decker was already recognized as a world-class runner. Unable to attend the 1972 Olympics as she was too young, the pigtailed  14-year-old nicknamed "Little Mary Decker," won international acclaim in 1973 with a win in the 800 meters at a US-Soviet meet in Minsk, beating the reigning Olympic silver medallist, Nijolė Sabaitė.

By the end of 1972, Decker was ranked first in the United States and fourth in the world in the 800 meters. In 1973 she gained her first world record, running an indoor mile in 4:40.1. By 1974, Decker was the world Indoor record holder with 2:02.4 for 880 yards, and 2:01.8 for 800 meters.

By the end of 1974, she had developed a case of the muscle condition compartment syndrome. This resulted in a series of injuries, which meant that she did not compete in the 1976 Olympics, because of stress fractures in her lower leg. In 1978 she had an operation to try to cure compartment syndrome, which kept her out of competition for a period. After recovering from surgery, she spent two seasons at the University of Colorado at Boulder on a track scholarship. In 1979, she became the second American woman (the first was Francie Larrieu) to break the 4:30 mile in American record time. Decker was the first woman to break the 4:20 barrier for the mile in 1980 when she ran it in 4:17.55. However, this time was never ratified by the IAAF. She did not compete at the 1980 Moscow Olympics due to the American boycott.  She did however receive one of 461 Congressional Gold Medals created especially for the US athletes.

In 1981 she married fellow American distance runner Ron Tabb. The couple divorced in 1983.  In 1982, under the name Mary Tabb, she ran the mile in 4:18.08, breaking the official record of 4:20.89 by the Soviet Lyudmila Veselkova. This time was ratified.

Career peak
In 1982 Decker-Tabb set six world records, at distances ranging from the mile run to 10,000 meters.  She received the James E. Sullivan Award as the top amateur athlete in the United States.

The following year she achieved the "Double Decker," winning both the 1500 meters and 3000 meters events at the World Championships in Helsinki, Finland.  Her history of relatively easy wins in the United States left her tactical abilities suspect in Helsinki, as she chose not to run in close order because so few athletes could keep up with her, a situation that the Soviet runners hoped to use to their advantage.  Her wins against Soviet World Record holders proved a redemption of her competitive guile.  After her double win she won the Jesse Owens Award from USA Track and Field and Sports Illustrated magazine named her Sportsperson of the Year. Shortly before her World Championship victories, Decker improved her U.S. 1500 meters record to 3:57.12 in Stockholm on July 26, 1983. This record stood for 32 years until Shannon Rowbury ran 3:56.29 on July 17, 2015.

The 1984 Olympic incident

Decker was heavily favored to win a gold medal in the 3000 meters run at the 1984 Summer Olympics, held at Los Angeles. In the final, barefoot runner Zola Budd, representing Great Britain, had been running side by side with Decker for three laps and moved ahead. In an attempt to put pressure on Budd, Decker remained close by in a crowded space. Decker stood on Budd, then shortly after, collided with the barefoot runner and fell spectacularly to the curb, injuring her hip. As a result, Mary Decker did not finish the race, which was won by  Maricica Puica of Romania (Budd finished seventh). Decker was carried off the track in tears by her boyfriend (and later, husband), British discus thrower Richard Slaney. At a press conference she said that Budd was to blame for the collision. While it is generally the trailing athlete's responsibility to avoid contact with the runner ahead, it is also an accepted convention among most distance runners that the leader be a full stride ahead before cutting in. International track officials initially disqualified Budd for obstruction, but she was reinstated just one hour later once officials had viewed films of the race. Despite being behind Budd, Decker's claim that Budd had bumped into her leg was supported by a number of sports journalists. The claim was not accepted by the director of the games or the IAAF.

Decker and Budd next met in July 1985, in a 3000 meters race at Crystal Palace National Sports Centre in London, England. Decker won the race, and Budd finished in fourth place. After the race, the two women shook hands and made up. Decker later went on record as claiming that she was unfairly robbed of the LA 3000 meters gold medal by Budd, but said many years after the event "The reason I fell, some people think she tripped me deliberately. I happen to know that wasn't the case at all. The reason I fell is because I am and was very inexperienced in running in a pack."

Decker had a successful 1985 season, winning twelve mile and 3000 meters races in the European athletics calendar, which included a new official world record for the women's mile of 4:16.71 in Zurich (Natalya Artyomova's 4:15.8 in 1984, not being ratified by the IAAF).  Since that race in 1985, her time has only been bettered on four occasions.  That race in Zurich also matched her with both of the other principle athletes from the Olympic race, Slaney vanquishing both Puica and Budd who themselves ran times that until July 9, 2017 also ranked in the top 10 of all time.

She sat out the 1986 season to give birth to her only child, daughter Ashley Lynn (born May 30, 1986), then missed the 1987 season due to injury.  She qualified for the 1988 Summer Olympics in Seoul, South Korea, competing at 1500 meters and 3000 meters, but finished in 8th and 10th respectively, failing to win a medal.  She did not qualify for the 1992 Games.

Doping controversy
In 1996, at the age of 37, as she qualified for the 5000 meters at the Atlanta Olympics, a urine test taken in June at the Olympic Trials showed a testosterone to epitestosterone (T/E) ratio greater than the allowable maximum of six to one. At the time of the positive test Decker was being coached by Alberto Salazar.

Decker and her lawyers contended that the T/E ratio test is unreliable for women, especially women in their late 30s or older who are taking birth control pills. In the meantime, Decker was eliminated in the heats at the Olympics.

In June 1997, the IAAF banned Decker from competition. In September 1999, a USATF panel reinstated her. The IAAF cleared her to compete, but took the case to arbitration. In April 1999, the arbitration panel ruled against her, after which the IAAF – through a retroactive ban, even though she was cleared to compete – stripped her of a silver medal she had won in the 1500 meters at the 1997 World Indoor Championships.

In April 1999, Decker filed suit against both the IAAF and the U.S. Olympic Committee which administered the test, arguing that the test is flawed and cannot distinguish between androgens caused by the use of banned substances and androgens resulting from the use of birth control pills. The court ruled that it had no jurisdiction, a decision that was upheld on appeal.

The (T/E) ratio test has seen its standards tightened to a 4:1 ratio, instead of the previous 6:1 ratio, and laboratories now also run a carbon isotope ratio test (CIR) if the ratio is unusually high.

Later life
Throughout her later career, Decker had suffered a series of stress induced fractures. After the loss of her 1999 legal case, she agreed to have a series of more than 30 orthopedic procedures, mainly on her legs and feet, in an attempt to enable her to run competitively in marathons. However, after the surgeries she continued to experience injuries. As a result, she retired with her husband to a  property in Eugene, Oregon, where she jogs every other day.

International competitions

See also
List of sportspeople sanctioned for doping offences

References

External links
California State Records before 2000

1958 births
Living people
People from Garden Grove, California
People from Lebanon Township, New Jersey
Sportspeople from Hunterdon County, New Jersey
Sportspeople from Orange County, California
Track and field athletes from California
Track and field athletes from New Jersey
American female middle-distance runners
American masters athletes
Olympic track and field athletes of the United States
Athletes (track and field) at the 1984 Summer Olympics
Athletes (track and field) at the 1988 Summer Olympics
Athletes (track and field) at the 1996 Summer Olympics
Pan American Games track and field athletes for the United States
Pan American Games gold medalists for the United States
Pan American Games medalists in athletics (track and field)
Athletes (track and field) at the 1979 Pan American Games
World Athletics Championships athletes for the United States
World record setters in athletics (track and field)
World Athletics Championships medalists
American sportspeople in doping cases
Doping cases in athletics
James E. Sullivan Award recipients
Congressional Gold Medal recipients
University of Colorado alumni
World Athletics Championships winners
Medalists at the 1979 Pan American Games